Śraddhā is often glossed in English as faith. Āsthā is used for faith, religious beliefs and God. The term figures importantly in the literature, teachings, and discourse of Hinduism, Jainism, and Buddhism. Sri Aurobindo describes Śraddhā as "the soul's belief in the Divine's existence, wisdom, power, love and grace" Without diacritical marks, it is usually written as Sraddha.

Faith plays a crucial role within Hinduism, underpinning all assumptions, beliefs and inferences. Within Hinduism, having faith means one maintains trust in god, scriptures, dharma, and the path of liberation (moksha). The Brihadranyaka Upanishad (3.29.1) states that the resting ground of faith is the heart", emphasising that to have faith is to follow ones heart and intuition.

Within Hinduism, a key understanding of faith is maintaining trust in the scriptures. Hindu's believe that it is not possible to understand or experience god directly with human senses, and so god's presence is inferred through descriptions in the scriptures.

An example of this can be seen in Bruhadaranyak Upanishad 3.8.9:

O Gargi, the sun and moon are held in their positions; under the mighty rule of this Immutable; O Gargi, heaven and earth maintain their positions; under the mighty rule of this immutable - Bruhadaranyak Upanishad 3.8.9 

It can be associated with faith, trust, confidence, and loyalty. The teacher Ammachi describes it as the "constant alertness arising from Love", and when choosing a single word to translate it into English, has used "awareness". Other writers have also described the concept with emphasis on the intersection of faith and mindfulness, and it has been translated in this vein with words such as "diligence".

See also
 Shraddha
 Faith in Buddhism

Notes

Sanskrit words and phrases
Hindu theology
Faith